is a former Japanese YouTuber and rapper. He was part of the hip hop group Kaiware Hummer, releasing music under the stage name Bema.

In January 2021, Watanabe allegedly solicited nude photos from an underage fan, which subsequently caused his agency UUUM to drop him as an act and YouTube to permanently ban his channel.

Career

When Watanabe was in middle school, he posted on Niconico under the username . Watanabe began uploading to YouTube in 2011. Watanabe released his debut solo album, Shinryakuteki Sukima, on November 26, 2016. In addition, Watanabe co-authored an autobiography about Kaiware Hummer with fellow members Naru and Imiga titled Kaiware Hummer Monogatari, with the first book released on July 20, 2017 and the second book released on August 31, 2017. Watanabe made an appearance on YouTuber 's second album Season 2, in which he was a featured artist on the song "Kokomo."

In 2018, Watanabe left Genesis One and signed with UUUM as his network. By June 2019, he had over 2.7 million subscribers on his main channel. After getting arrested on suspicion of battery in the same month, his activities were cancelled for the remainder of the year, including an appearance with Kaiware Hummer at A-nation 2019, while he remained at his agency to do clerical work. On February 7, 2020, UUUM announced that Watanabe would resume activities on February 14, 2020 on a new channel, which was named "Mahoto." On January 22, 2021, UUUM announced that Watanabe had been dismissed from the agency after confirming he solicited nude photos from an underage girl. On January 28, 2021, YouTube suspended his channel for community violations. Following the events, on March 2, 2021, Watanabe issued an apology on Twitter and also announced he was retiring from YouTube.

Since his retirement from YouTube, Watanabe started editing videos for Gardman, a YouTube channel with 2 million subscribers, earning him a million yen a month.

Personal life

On January 21, 2021, Watanabe announced that he was marrying actress and former Keyakizaka46 member Yui Imaizumi and that they were expecting a child. The child, a daughter was born in June 2021. Following Watanabe's 2021 arrest, Imaizumi announced in July 2021 that she would not be registering their marriage and that she would be raising the child herself with support from her family.

Legal troubles

On June 2, 2019, Watanabe was arrested on suspicion of battery. He had reportedly beat a female acquaintance and stomped on her face during an argument while he was intoxicated. On June 19, 2019, he issued an apology and also claimed he reconciled with the victim. On July 18, 2019, UUUM later stated that Watanabe's activities would be suspended, including Kaiware Hummer's appearance at A-nation 2019. Instead, he would be doing clerical work within the agency until December 31, 2019, though there were no immediate plans of him returning in January 2020. During this period, he was also prohibited from drinking.

On January 21, 2021, the same day where Watanabe announced his marriage to Yui Imaizumi, Japanese YouTuber Korekore posted a live stream video where a 15-year-old girl alleged Watanabe had solicited nude photos from her and then blackmailed her with them, with screenshots of private messages from November 2020. On January 22, 2021, UUUM announced that Watanabe confirmed the reports and was dismissed from the agency. The victim later contacted the police, which resulted in Watanabe being arrested on suspicion of forced child prostitution and possession of child pornography on March 17, 2021 after investigation. He was released on April 2, 2021 and indicted by the Tokyo Metropolitan Police Department on April 22 of the same year. On June 14, 2021, he was fined .

Discography

Studio albums

Publications

Notes

References

1992 births
Living people
Japanese rappers
People from Ōita Prefecture
Japanese YouTubers
YouTube channels launched in 2011
YouTube channels closed in 2021